Brad Davis (born 13 March 1968) is an Australian former professional rugby league footballer who played in the 1990s and 2000s. He is a rugby league (RL) and current rugby union (RU) coach. He coached club level rugby league for the Villeneuve Leopards, Assistant Coach of the Castleford Tigers. Davis coached club level rugby union (RU) for Bath (Defence and Skills Coach), Wasps (Defence Coach), Ospreys Rugby (Defence Coach), and London Irish.

Honoured at Castleford Tigers
Davis is a Tigers Hall of Fame Inductee.

References

External links
Statistics at rugbyleagueproject.org
Statistics at thecastlefordtigers.co.uk ℅ web.archive.org
Quotes: Fawlty Towers Referees
No joke for Davis
Davis Joins Villeneuve
Life On The Inside – Brad Davis
Davis secures Bath coaching post
Davis Secures Bath Coaching Post
Castleford Earn Super League Promotion
Profile At Bathrugby.Com
Bath's Brad Davis prepared for new role as backs coach
Brad Davis: Bath remain silent over first-team coach's future
Brad Davis: Coach parts company with Bath Rugby
Wasps: Rotherham Titans coach Lee Blackett to join backroom staff
Age No Concern To Davis
Castleford Pin Hopes On Sealing Davis' Return
Davis Aiming To Turn On The Old Magic For Castleford
Halifax Plea Delays Davis' Castleford Comeback
Davis Urges Bath To Seize Control
Victory Is Vital – Edwards
Super Davis The Oldest
Davis Conquers Whitehaven To Put Tigers Back In Top Flight

1968 births
Living people
Australian rugby league coaches
Australian rugby league players
Australian rugby union coaches
Bath Rugby
Castleford Tigers players
Huddersfield Giants players
London Irish
Mansfield Marksman players
Rugby league five-eighths
Rugby league halfbacks
Rugby league hookers
Villeneuve Leopards coaches
Villeneuve Leopards players
Wakefield Trinity captains
Wakefield Trinity players
York Wasps players